Mohammad Yasser Shoshara (born 11 April 1988, in Syria) is a Syrian footballer. He currently plays for Al-Wahda, which competes in the Syrian Premier League, the top division in Syria.

References

External links
 
 Profile Pescara.it
 Profile Goal.com

1988 births
Living people
Syrian footballers
Syria international footballers
Syrian expatriate footballers
Expatriate footballers in Iraq
Syrian expatriate sportspeople in Iraq
Association football defenders
Sportspeople from Damascus
Syrian Premier League players